Burning Daylight is a novel by Jack London, published in 1910, one of the best-selling books of that year and London's best-selling book in his lifetime. The novel has been adapted for film.

Plot
The first part of the novel takes place in the Yukon Territory in 1893 and in Alaska. The second part of the novel takes place in  San Francisco and the San Francisco Bay Area. "Burning Daylight", the main character, is partially based upon the life of Oakland entrepreneur "Borax" Smith, but named for Elam Harnish (1866-1941).

Distribution
In 1910, the New York Herald published the novel serially, later that year, Macmillan published the novel as a book.

Etymology
Shakespeare uses "burning daylight" in Romeo and Juliet and The Merry Wives of Windsor.

American film adaptations
 Burning Daylight: The Adventures of 'Burning Daylight' in Alaska (1914)
 Burning Daylight: The Adventures of 'Burning Daylight' in Civilization (1914)
 Burning Daylight (1920 film)
 Burning Daylight (1928 film)

Canadian film adaptation
 Burning Daylight (2010)

The film, set in New York City, shot entirely in and around Toronto, starring Robert Knepper, was produced and directed by Kazakhstani-Canadian Sanzhar Sultanov. This version, based on two short stories and the novel, concentrated on the second half of the book, " in Civilization". The film had a Jack London Foundation benefit preview screening on August 9, 2010 at the Sebastiani Theater  in Jack London's late-life hometown of Sonoma, California.

Reception
Some critics see Burning Daylight not a novel but a series of short stories.

References

External links

 Jack London. Burning Daylight 
 Jack London. Burning Daylight 
 Jack London. Burning Daylight 
 Jack London. Burning Daylight 
 Jack London. Burning Daylight 
 Jack London. Burning Daylight 
 

1910 American novels
Novels by Jack London
American adventure novels
American historical novels
Novels set in Yukon
Novels set in the 19th century
Fiction set in 1893
American novels adapted into films
Klondike Gold Rush